Chiloquin State Airport  is a public use airport located one nautical mile (2 km) west of the central business district of Chiloquin, a city in Klamath County, Oregon, United States. The airport was established in 1946 by the City of Chiloquin and ownership was transferred in 1960 to the State of Oregon. It is included in the National Plan of Integrated Airport Systems for 2011–2015, which categorized it as a general aviation facility.

Facilities and aircraft 
Chiloquin State Airport covers an area of 115 acres (47 ha) at an elevation of 4,217 feet (1,285 m) above mean sea level. It has one runway designated 17/35 with an asphalt surface measuring 3,735 by 60 feet (1,138 x 18 m).

For the 12-month period ending June 23, 2010, the airport had 3,500 aircraft operations, an average of 291 per month: 86% general aviation and 14% air taxi. At that time there were 8 aircraft based at this airport, all single-engine.

References

External links 
 Chiloquin State Airport: Airport Layout Plan Report from Oregon Department of Aviation
 Aerial image as of August 1994 from USGS The National Map
 

Airports in Klamath County, Oregon
1946 establishments in Oregon